K S Makhan (born Kuldeep Singh Takhar) is a Punjabi wrestler turned singer, Actor, Politician, and songwriter. He has written his song "Dil di tamana" from his movie "Sajjan the real friend"

Personal life
KS Makhan currently resides in Surrey, British Columbia. He was born in the village of Shankar in Jalandhar, Punjab, near Nakodar. He is married and has two sons named Ekam Singh Takhar and Sajjan Singh Takhar. Makhan is a former Kabbadi player and known for his motivational songs towards sports and working out. Makhan is also known to be constantly working out.

Career
K S Makhan's first album was Numbra Te Milde. He has worked with music producer Aman Hayer and musicians Sukhpal Sukh and Atul Sharma. His voice fused with Aman Hayer's music have enabled him to stay with the lead pack of Punjabi singers. His albums include Glassi, Billo, Muskan, Yaar Mastaane, Good Luck Charm and James Bond. His other tracks are "Mitran Di Motor", "Takle", "Gabru Top Da", "Fight", "Talwaaran", "Sitare", "Jatt Warga Yaar", "Band Botle", "Badmaashi" and "Pakka Yaar". In 2012, he reached number one with his track "Dil Vich Vas Gayi". He made his comeback with the song "Willpower" and his song "Flood Back" gained popularity worldwide in 2021.

Film career
In 2012, Makhan made his film debut in film Pinky Moge Wali, with a cast including Gavie Chahal, Neeru Bajwa, and Geeta Zaildar. He played the role of 'Villain' in this film. His next film was Sajjan – The Real Friend, which was released in January 2013, where he was lead actor.

Politics
K.S. Makhan joined the Bahujan Samaj Party on 9 February 2014. He was a candidate from Anandpur Sahib (Lok Sabha constituency) for the 2014 Lok Sabha elections. He finished second with a total off 0 votes. In 2016 Makhan joined the  Shromani Akali Dal party.

Discography

Singles

Filmography

Tagged Songs

References

External links
 Official website

Punjabi-language singers
Indian Sikhs
Living people
1970 births